New Washermenpet (known in Tamil as  "புது வண்ணாரபேட்டை") is a seashore area located in the northern part of Chennai. It is mainly an industrial area where many large corporations are located, such as Eveready Batteries, Savorit, Metal Box and many heavy metal industries. It comes under the Chennai Corporation Tondiapet Zone.

Cities and towns in Chennai district
Populated coastal places in India
Coromandel Coast